Elections were held in Illinois on Tuesday, November 2, 1954.

Primaries were held April 13, 1954.

Election information
1954 was a midterm election year in the United States.

Turnout
In the primary election, turnout was 32.06% with 1,695,491 ballots cast (957,042 Democratic and 738,449 Republican).

In the general election, turnout was 65.34% with 3,455,173 ballots cast.

Federal elections

United States Senate 

Democratic Senator Paul Douglas was reelected to a second term.

United States House 

All 25 Illinois seats in the United States House of Representatives were up for election in 1954.

Democrats flipped three Republican-held seats, leaving the Illinois House delegation to consist of 13 Republicans and 12 Democrats.

State elections

Treasurer 

Incumbent first-term Treasurer, Republican Elmer J. Hoffman, did not seek reelection. Republican Warren Wright, a former one-term holder of the office, was elected to succeed him.

This was the final Illinois Treasurer election to a two-year term, as voters also approved a a constitutional amendment which extended term length to four-years beginning in the following election.

Democratic primary

Republican primary
Former Illinois Treasurer Warren Wright won the Republican primary. He defeated fellow former Illinois Treasurer Conrad F. Becker, as well as Robert J. Branson.

General election

Superintendent of Public Instruction 

Incumbent Superintendent of Public Instruction Vernon L. Nickell, a Republican, was elected to a fourth term.

Democratic primary

Republican primary

General election

State Senate
Seats in the Illinois Senate were up for election in 1954. Republicans retained control of the chamber.

State House of Representatives
Seats in the Illinois House of Representatives were up for election in 1954. Republicans retained control of the chamber.

Trustees of University of Illinois

An election was held for three of nine seats for Trustees of University of Illinois.

The election saw the reelection of Democrat former member Kenney E. Williamson (who previously had served one full term and a partial term), and first-term Democratic incumbents George Wirt Herrick, Frances Best Watkins.

Judicial elections

Supreme Court

Fifth Supreme Court Judicial District 
A judicial election was held on June 7, 1954, for the Fifth Supreme Court Judicial District. Republican Joseph E. Daily was unopposed.

Lower courts
On November 2, 1954, a special election was held to fill a vacancy on the Circuit Court of Cook County.

Ballot measures
Three ballot measures were put before voters in 1954. All three were legislatively referred constitutional amendments.

In order to be approved, legislatively referred state statues required the support of a majority of those voting on the statute. In order to be placed on the ballot, proposed legislatively referred constitutional amendments needed to be approved by two-thirds of each house of the Illinois General Assembly. In order to be approved, they required approval of either two-thirds of those voting on the amendment itself or a majority of all ballots cast in the general elections.

Illinois Michigan Canal Amendment 
The Illinois Michigan Canal Amendment was approved. It eliminated from the constitution the requirement that the Illinois and Michigan Canal or other canal and or waterway could only be sold or leased with specific approval of a majority of voters participating in a general state election. It also removed from the constitution the provision under which the Illinois deep waterway was both financed and constructed.

Legislative Apportionment Amendment
Legislative Apportionment Amendment, a legislatively referred constitutional amendment which amended Sections 6, 7, and 8 of Article IV of the 1870 Constitution of Illinois was approved by voters. Among other specifications, it directed the Illinois General Assembly to elect one Senator from each of 58 senatorial districts and three representatives from each of 59 representative districts.

In order for constitutional amendments to be passed by voters, they required either two-thirds support among those specifically voting on the measure or 50% support among all ballots cast in the elections.

State Treasurer Amendment
State Treasurer Amendment, a legislatively referred constitutional amendment which amended Sections 1, 2, and 3 of Article IV of the 1870 Constitution of Illinois was approved by voters. Among its changes was, beginning with the 1956 election, making the term of the State Treasurer be expanded from two to four years.

In order for constitutional amendments to be passed by voters, they required either two-thirds support among those specifically voting on the measure or 50% support among all ballots cast in the elections.

Local elections
Local elections were held.

References

 
Illinois